Bargyzbash (Barğıźbaş) is a rural locality (a village) in Mayadykovsky Selsoviet, Dyurtyulinsky District, Bashkortostan, Russia. The population was 51 as of 2010. There is 1 street.

Geography 
Bargyzbash is located 32 km north of Dyurtyuli (the district's administrative centre) by road. Mayadyk is the nearest rural locality.

References 

Rural localities in Dyurtyulinsky District